This list is incomplete. You can help by expanding it.

This is a list of former European colonies.

North America

Northern and Central America

Britain

British America (New Britain)
Canadian colonies
Island of St. John
Rupert's Land (A private estate stretching from the Atlantic to the Rocky Mountains, and from the prairies to the Arctic Circle.) 
Lower Canada
 Province of Quebec
Upper Canada
Newfoundland Colony
"Thirteen Colonies"
New England Colonies:
Province of Massachusetts Bay
Province of New Hampshire
Colony of Rhode Island and Providence Plantations
Connecticut Colony
Province of New York
Province of New Jersey
Province of Pennsylvania
Delaware Colony
Province of Maryland
Colony of Virginia
Province of North Carolina
Province of South Carolina
Province of Georgia
Other North American colonies
Province of East Florida
Province of West Florida
Indian Reserve
Middle Colonies
Chesapeake Colonies
Southern Colonies
Oregon Country (disputed with France)
British Honduras
Mosquito Coast
Bay Islands

Belgium

 Santo Tomás de Castilla, Guatemala

Denmark

 Greenland
 Danish West Indies

Iceland

 Greenland
 Vinland (Newfoundland?)

France

New France
Newfoundland
Île-Royale (Cape Breton Island)
Saint-Domingue (Haiti)
Acadia
Quebec
Guadelupe

Netherlands
 	 
New Netherlands (Nieuw-Amsterdam / New York)

Norway

 Iceland
 Greenland

Portugal

Claim to Labrador
Claim and settlement in Terra Nova (Newfoundland)

Russia

Fort Ross, California
Kauai
Russian Alaska

Scotland

Nova Scotia

Spain
México (1521) 
Viceroyalty of New Spain (1535–1821)
Las Californias
Nuevo Reino de León
Nuevo Santander
Nueva Vizcaya
Santa Fe de Nuevo México
Nueva Extremadura
Nueva Galicia
Captaincy General of Cuba
Puerto Rico
Santo Domingo (Dominican Republic)
Captaincy General of Guatemala
Costa Rica 	 
El Salvador 
East Florida and West Florida	 
Settlement at Nootka, near Vancouver Island, Canada

Sweden

 New Sweden

Caribbean

Brandenburg

St Thomas

Britain
Bahamas
Barbados
Belize
Jamaica
Leeward Islands
Antigua and Barbuda
Dominica
Saint Christopher (St Kitts)-Nevis
 Trinidad and Tobago
Windward Islands
Grenada
Saint Lucia
Saint Vincent and the Grenadines

Courland 

New Courland (Tobago)

Denmark-Norway

Saint John
Saint Thomas
Saint Croix

France

Anguilla 
Antigua and Barbuda 
Dominica 
Grenada 
Montserrat
Nevis
Saint Christophe (St Kitts)
Saint Croix
Saint-Domingue (Hispaniola) 
Sainte-Lucia (St Lucia)
Saint Vincent and the Grenadines 
Sint Eustatius 
Tobago

Knights of Malta
Saint Barthélemy
 Saint Martin

Saint Christopher (St Kitts)
Saint Croix
Tortuga (off coast of Haiti)

Netherlands

Anegada
New Walcheren (Tobago)
Saint Croix 
Tortola 
Virgin Gorda

Portugal
Barbados

Scotland
Caledonia (Gulf of Darién)

Spain
Belize
Jamaica
Spanish West Indies
The Bahamas
Cuba
Hispaniola
Puerto Rico
Trinidad

Sweden
Saint-Barthélemy

Sweden-Norway
Cooper Island

South America

Britain

British Guiana
Berbice, Essequibo, Demerara
Surinam

France

Brazil (Rio de Janeiro briefly, and São Luís briefly)
(see France Antarctique and France Équinoxiale)
Iles Malouines (Falkland Islands)

Netherlands

Berbice (Guyana) 
Demerara 
Surinam (Suriname)
Essequibo 
New Holland (Brazil – Half the captaincies)

Portugal

Brazil
Cisplatina (Uruguay)
Misiones Orientales

Spain

 Kingdom of Tierra Firme (1498-1537)
 Governorate of New Andalusia (1501-1513)

 Governorate of Castilla de Oro (1514-1539)
 Governorate of New Castile (1529-1542)
 Governorate of New Toledo (1529-1542)
 Governorate of New León (1529-1539)
 Governorate of New Andalusia (1534-1617)

Viceroyalty of Peru (1542-1824)
New Kingdom of Granada (1538-1717) (1723-1739)
Real Audiencia of Panamá (1538-1717) (1723-1739)
Governorate of Terra Australis (1539-1555)
Captaincy General of Chile (1541-1818)
Real Audiencia of Lima (1542-1821)
Governorate of the Río de la Plata (1549-1776)
Real Audiencia of Charcas (1559-1776)
Real Audiencia of Quito (1563-1717) (1723-1739)
Real Audiencia of Concepción (1565-1575)
Governorate of Guayrá (1617-1776)
Real Audiencia of Buenos Aires (1661-1671)
Real Audiencia of Cuzco (1787-1825)
Viceroyalty of New Granada (1717-1723) (1739-1810) (1815-1822)
Real Audiencia of Panamá (1717-1723) (1739-1752)
Real Audiencia of Quito (1717-1723) (1739-1822)
Captaincy General of Venezuela (1777-1824)
Viceroyalty of the Río de la Plata (1776-1814)
Governorate of Paraguay (1776-1782)
Real Audiencia of Charcas (1776-1821)
Upper Peru (1821-1825)

Augsburg/Nuremburg

Welserland

Africa

Belgium

Belgian Congo (Democratic Republic of the Congo)
Lado Enclave
Ruanda-Urundi (Rwanda and Burundi)

Brandenburg

Arguin (in Mauritania)
Brandenburger Gold Coast (coastal settlements in Ghana)

Britain

Anglo-Egyptian Sudan (Sudan)
Basutoland (Lesotho)
Balleland (Benin)
Bechuanaland (Botswana)
British East Africa (Kenya)
British Somaliland (Somaliland)
British Togoland (eastern Ghana)
British Cameroons (split between Nigeria and Cameroon)
British Mauritius
British Egypt
Khedivate of Egypt
Sultanate of Egypt
Kingdom of Egypt
Gambia Colony and Protectorate
Gold Coast (Ghana)
Colonial Nigeria
Niger Coast Protectorate
Northern Nigeria Protectorate
Southern Nigeria Protectorate
Colony and Protectorate of Nigeria
Northern Rhodesia (Zambia)
Nyasaland (Malawi)
Sierra Leone Colony and Protectorate
Union of South Africa
British Cape Colony
Natal Colony
Orange River Colony
Transvaal Colony
South West Africa (Namibia)
Walvis Bay 
Southern Rhodesia (Zimbabwe)
Swaziland (Eswatini)
Tanganyika Territory (mainland Tanzania)
Uganda Protectorate
Sultanate of Zanzibar (insular Tanzania)

Courland

St. Andrews Island (in the Gambia)

Denmark-Norway

Danish Gold Coast (coastal settlements in Ghana)

France

Albreda (in The Gambia)
Comoros 
French Dahomey (Benin)
French Algeria
French Cameroon (91% of modern Cameroon)
French Chad
French Congo (Republic of the Congo)
French Guinea (Guinea)
French Upper Volta (Republic of Upper Volta, Burkina Faso)
French Somaliland (Djibouti)
French Sudan (Mali)
French Togoland (Togo)
French Madagascar 
Gabon
Ivory Coast (Côte d'Ivoire)
Colonial Mauritania
French protectorate in Morocco (89% of Morocco)
Oubangui-Chari (Central African Republic)
Senegal
Senegambia and Niger
Upper Senegal and Niger
Colony of Niger
French protectorate of Tunisia

Germany

German East Africa (Burundi, Rwanda, Tanzania)
German South-West Africa (Namibia)
Kamerun (split between Cameroon and Nigeria)
Togoland (split between Togo and Ghana)
Wituland (Lamu Island, owned by Kenya)

Hospitaller Malta 

 Tripoli

Italy

Italian East Africa
Italian Eritrea
Italian Somaliland (now Somalia)
Italian Ethiopia
Amhara Governorate
Galla-Sidamo Governorate
Harar Governorate
Scioa Governorate
Italian Libya

Netherlands

Arguin Island (in Mauritania)
Dutch Cape Colony
Dutch Gold Coast (settlements along coast of Ghana, including El Mina)
Dutch Loango-Angola (Luanda, Sonyo and Cabinda)
Gorée (Senegal)
Moçambique (Delagoa Bay)
São Tomé
South Africa
Mauritius

Portugal
Ajuda (Whydah, in Benin)
Angola
Annobón
Cabinda
Cape Verde (Cabo Verde)
Ceuta
Fort of São João Baptista de Ajudá
Gorée (in Senegal)
Malindi
Mombasa
Algarve Ultramar (Morocco)
Agadir
Alcacer Ceguer
Arzila
Azamor
Mazagan
Mogador
Safim
 Nigeria (Lagos area)
 Mozambique
Portuguese Gold Coast (settlements along coast of Ghana)
Portuguese Guinea (Guinea-Bissau)
Quíloa
São Tomé and Príncipe
Tangier
Zanzibar
Ziguinchor

Russia

Sagallo

Spain

Bona
Bougie
Jerba
Fernando Po and Annobon (insular Equatorial Guinea)
Oran
Port Guinea
Río Muni (mainland Equatorial Guinea)
Spanish Protectorate in Morocco
Spanish West Africa
Río de Oro
Saguia el-Hamra
Tarfaya Strip
Ifni

Sweden

Swedish Gold Coast (coastal settlements in Ghana)

West Asia

Britain
Aden Protectorate
Bahrain
Cyprus
Mandatory Iraq
Sheikhdom of Kuwait
Muscat and Oman
Mandatory Palestine 
Qatar
South Arabia
Emirate of Transjordan
Trucial States

France
 Syria
 Lebanon

Netherlands
Jemen, Al Mukha (Mocca)
Mesopotamia (Iraq, Al Basrah)

Portugal
Aden
Bandar Abbas (Iran)
Hormuz
Manama (Bahrain)
Muharraq Island (Bahrain)
Muscat (Oman)
 Qeshm

Russia

South Asia

Indian Ocean Area

Britain
Mauritius (British Mauritius)
Seychelles
Maldives

France

French Comoros
Isle de France (now Mauritius)
French Madagascar 
French Seychelles

Netherlands
 
Dutch Mauritius (now Mauritius)

Portugal

Laccadive Islands (Lakshadweep)
Maldive Islands
Socotra

Austria

Banquibazar & Cabelon
Nicobar Islands

Mainland

Britain

Afghanistan
British India (After independence from Britain, British India became Pakistan (East and West) and India – later East Pakistan gained independence from Pakistan under the name of Bangladesh)
Bangladesh
India 
Pakistan
Burma (Myanmar)
Ceylon (Sri Lanka)

Denmark-Norway

Frederik Oerne Islands (Nicobar Islands)
Serampore
Tranquebar

France

India
Pondicherry, Karikal, Yanaon, Mahé, and Chandernagore

Netherlands

Bangladesh (Dutch Bengal)
Ceylon
India (Dutch Bengal, Suratte, Malabar, Coromandel)

Portugal

Bombay
Calicut
Cambay
Cannanore
Ceylon (Ceilão)
Chaul
Chittagong
Cochin
Dadra and Nagar Haveli
Daman and Diu
Goa
Hughli
Masulipatnam
Mangalore
Surat
Syriam

Sweden
 
Parangipettai

Asia-Pacific

Austria

North Borneo
Tientsin

Britain

Australia
New South Wales
Queensland
South Australia
Swan River Colony/Western Australia
Van Diemen's Land (Tasmania)
Victoria
British Solomon Islands
British Western Pacific Territories
Christmas Island
Cocos Islands
Colonial Fiji
Gilbert and Ellice Islands (Kiribati & Tuvalu)
Hawaii (formerly Sandwich Islands)
Kingdom of Rarotonga (Cook Islands)
New Hebrides (Vanuatu, condominium with France)
New Zealand
Auckland Islands
Niue
Norfolk Island
Territory of Papua and New Guinea
Territory of New Guinea
Western Samoa
Phoenix Islands (part of Kiribati)
Solomon Islands
Territory of Papua
Tokelau
Tonga
Southeast Asia
Malaysia
British Malaya
Federated Malay States
Straits Settlements
Unfederated Malay States
British Borneo
North Borneo
Kingdom of Sarawak
 Brunei
 Bonin Islands (Japan)
Singapore
 China
Hong Kong
Jiujiang (British concession territory)
Weihaiwei (leased to the British government)
Shanghai International Settlement (merger of the British and American concessions and residency in Shanghai)
Tientsin (British concession territory)
Canton (British concession territory)

Belgium

Tientsin (concession territory)

France

East Asia
Kwang-Chou-Wan (廣州灣) leased territory, now the city of Zhanjiang (Guangdong province)
French settlements (French Concession of Shanghai, Guangdong, Tianjin, and Hankou)
French zone of influence officially recognized by China over the provinces of Yunnan, Guangxi, Hainan, and Guangdong 
 Indochina
Cambodia
Laos 
Vietnam 
Annam
Cochinchina
Tonkin 
New Hebrides (Vanuatu, condominium with Britain)
Ay de mi Alhama

Germany

Bismarck Archipelago
Caroline Islands (Karolinen)
German New Guinea
Gilbert Islands
German Samoa
Jiaozhou Bay (Kiautschou)
Kaiser-Wilhelmsland
Marshall Islands
Nauru
North Solomon Islands
Northern Marianas Islands (Marianen)
Palau
Tientsin

Italy

Tientsin (concession)

Netherlands
Burma (Myanmar) (Mrohaung (Arakan), Siriangh, Syriam, Ava, Martaban)
Dutch East Indies (Indonesia)
Dutch New Guinea (Western Part of Papua, Indonesia)
Malacca 
Dutch Formosa 
Dejima

Portugal

Flores
Macau
Malacca
Moluccas
Ambon
Ternate
Tidore
Portuguese Timor (Timor-Leste)
Portuguese Nagasaki
Solor

Russia

 Kazakhstan
 Kyrgyzstan
 Tajikistan
 Tientsin
 Turkmenistan
 Uzbekistan

Spain

Spanish East Indies
 Philippines 
Marianas Islands
Guam
Northern Marianas Islands
Caroline Islands
Marshall Islands

Antarctica

Britain 

 British Antarctic Territory

 Falkland Islands Dependencies
 South Georgia and the South Sandwich Islands

France 

 Adélie Land
 Amsterdam Island (New Amsterdam)
 Crozet Islands
 French Southern and Antarctic Lands
 Kerguelen Islands
 Saint Paul Island

Germany 

 New Swabia

Norway 

 Bouvet Island

 Peter I Island
 Queen Maud Land

Spain 

 Governorate of Terra Australis (1539-1555)

Europe

Britain

Corsica (the Anglo-Corsican Kingdom was a protectorate of Britain, now part of France)
Cyprus
Ionian islands (now part of Greece)
Ireland
Kingdom of Hanover
Malta
Menorca (now part of Spain)
Heligoland (now part of Germany)

Denmark

Iceland

Italy

Albania
Dodecanese

Russia

Belarus
 Finland
 Estonia
 Latvia
 Lithuania
 Moldova

Spain 
Spanish Netherlands
Franche-Comté
Kingdom of Portugal
Duchy of Milan
Kingdom of Naples
Kingdom of Sicily

See also
Austrian colonial policy
Belgian colonial empire
British colonial empire
Danish colonial empire
Dutch colonial empire
French colonial empire
German colonial empire
List of former German colonies
Italian colonial empire
Portuguese colonial empire
Evolution of the Portuguese Empire
Russian colonial empire
Spanish colonial empire
Swedish colonial empire

References

Europe